Inger Aufles (née Døving on 29 May 1941) is a retired Norwegian cross-country skier who competed during the 1960s and 1970s. She won three Winter Olympic medals with a gold (3 × 5 km relay: 1968) and two bronzes (10 km: 1968, 3 × 5 km relay: 1972). Aufles also earned a silver in the 3 × 5 km relay at the 1966 FIS Nordic World Ski Championships in Oslo. She won the national championships in 1968 and 1969, in the 10 km and 5 km respectively.

She was born in Valldal, and in 1961 moved to Mosjøen, where she married, changed her last name from Døving to Aufles, and started training in a cross-country skiing club. She became a member of the national team in 1966 and retired after the 1972 season.

Cross-country skiing results
All results are sourced from the International Ski Federation (FIS).

Olympic Games
 3 medals – (1 gold, 2 bronze)

World Championships
 1 medal – (1 silver)

References

External links

 
 

1941 births
Cross-country skiers at the 1968 Winter Olympics
Cross-country skiers at the 1972 Winter Olympics
Norwegian female cross-country skiers
Olympic cross-country skiers of Norway
Olympic gold medalists for Norway
Olympic bronze medalists for Norway
Living people
Olympic medalists in cross-country skiing
FIS Nordic World Ski Championships medalists in cross-country skiing
Medalists at the 1972 Winter Olympics
Medalists at the 1968 Winter Olympics
Sportspeople from Møre og Romsdal